The S&P/ASX 200 index is a market-capitalization weighted and float-adjusted stock market index of stocks listed on the Australian Securities Exchange. The index is maintained by Standard & Poor's and is considered the benchmark for Australian equity performance. It is based on the 200 largest ASX listed stocks, which together account for about 82% (as of March 2017) of Australia's share market capitalization.

The ASX 200 was started on 31 March 2000 with a value of 3133.3, equal to the value of the All Ordinaries at that date. The ASX 200 reached 6,000 points for the first time on Thursday 15 February 2007. On 22 December 2017, the ASX 200 was 6,069. The ASX 200 crossed the 7,000 points level for the first time on 16 January 2020.

Bloomberg, CNBC, Yahoo! Finance and Wikinvest use respectively the symbols AS51   and AXJO to refer to this index.

The ASX 200 webpage offers a Share market game as an educational tool with $50,000.00 AUD virtual cash.

Calculations 
The ASX 200 is capitalization-weighted, meaning a company's contribution to the index is relative to its total market value i.e., share price multiplied by the number of tradeable shares. The ASX 200 is also float adjusted, meaning the absolute numerical contribution to the index is relative to the stock's value at the float of the stock.

Although the calculation starts with a sum of the market capitalization of the constituent stocks, it is intended to reflect changes in share price, not market capitalization. Therefore, a fudge factor called the "Divisor" is used to ensure that the index value only changes when stock prices change, not whenever market capitalization changes. For example, if a company increases its market capitalization by issuing new shares, the Divisor is adjusted so that the ASX 200 index value does not change.

Contract Specifications 
The ASX 200 (ticker symbol AP) is traded on the ASX 24 exchange (SFE) with a contract size of 25 x S&P/ASX Index Points.

Eligibility
To be eligible for inclusion in the ASX 200 Index:

 Market capitalization: A stock's weight in the index is determined by the float-adjusted market capitalization of the stock. This is a function of current index shares, the latest available stock price and the Investable weight factor (IWF).  The IWF represents the float-adjusted portion of a stock's equity capital. Therefore, any strategic holdings that are classified as either corporate, private or government holdings reduce the IWF which, in turn, results in a reduction in the float-adjusted market capital. Shares owned by founders, directors of the company, trusts, venture capitalists and other companies are also excluded. These are also deemed strategic holders and are considered long-term holders of a stock's equity. Any strategic shareholdings that are greater than 5% of total issued shares are excluded from the relevant float.
 Liquidity: The trading volume in terms of dollar value and the number of transactions must exceed at least 0.025% of the sum of all eligible securities' trading volume. To ensure that no single company dominates trading, they are capped at a maximum of 15% for value, volume and transactions.
 Listing: Only stocks listed on the Australian Stock Exchange will be considered for inclusion in any of the S&P/ASX indices.

Constituent companies
The number of companies in the index is dynamic and does not always amount to exactly 200. On average, the index is rebalanced every quarter by Standard & Poor's.

, the constituent stocks of the ASX 200 in alphabetical order by symbol are

See also

 List of Australian exchange-traded funds listed on ASX
 S&P/ASX 20
 S&P/ASX 50
 S&P/ASX 300
 All Ordinaries

References

External links
 S&P/ASX 200 page at Standard & Poor's
 S&P/ASX 200 Share Prices
S&P/ASX 200 Index profile at Wikinvest
 Bloomberg page for AS51:IND
 Top companies in the S&P/ASX 200

Australian stock market indices
A200
Australian Securities Exchange